Mario Ierardi (born 19 February 1998) is an Italian football player. He plays for  club Vicenza.

Club career

Genoa 
Ierardi was a youth product of Geona youth team.

Loan to Ravenna 
On 1 July 2017, Ierardi was signed by Serie C side Ravenna on a season-long loan deal. On 10 September he made his Serie C debut for Ravenna as a substitute replacing Riccardo Barzaghi in the 84th minute of a 5–1 home defeat  against Triestina. On 22 September, Ierardi played his first match as a starter for Ravenna, a 1–0 home win over Modena, he was replaced after 81 minute. On 1 October he played his first entire match for Ravenna, a 1–0 away win over Fano. Ierardi ended his season-long loan to Ravenna with only 14 appearances.

Loan to Südtirol 
On 13 July 2018, Ierardi was loaned to Serie C club Südtirol on a season-long loan deal. On 30 July he made his debut for Südtirol in a 2–1 home win over Albalonga in the first round of Coppa Italia, he played the entire match. On 5 August he played in the second round in a 1–0 away win over Venezia. One week later he played in the third round, a 2–0 away win over Frosinone. On 17 September he made his Serie C debut for Südtirol in a 1–0 home win over Teramo, he played the entire match. On 26 December he was sent-off with a double yellow card in the 79th minute of a 1–1 away draw against Monza. Ierardi ended his loan to Südtirol with 31 appearances.

Südtirol 
On 12 July 2019, after the loan, Ierardi joined to Serie C club Südtirol on a free-transfer and he signed a 3-year contract. On 4 August he made his season debut for the club and he also scored his first professional goal in the 74th minute of a 4–1 home win over Città di Fasano in the first round of Coppa Italia, he played the entire match. Three weeks later, on 25 August, he made his league debut with a 2–1 away win over Vis Pesaro, he played the entire match. On 21 September, Ierardi scored his first in Serie C in the 51st minute of a 1–0 away win over Arzignano Valchiampo. On 22 January he scored his second goal for the club in the second minute of a 2–0 home win over Vis Pesaro.

Vicenza 
On 18 August 2020, Ierardi joined to newly promoted Serie B club Vicenza on an undisclosed fee and he signed a 3-year contract.

Loan to Pescara 
On 26 January 2022, he was loaned to Pescara.

International career 
Ierardi rappresented Italy at U-18 and U-19 level. On 14 January 2016, Ierardi made his debut at U-18 level in a 6–0 home win over Belgium U-18, he was replaced by Niccolò Tofanari in the 78th minute. On 13 April 2016 he played his first entire match for Italy U-18, a 2–1 home defeat against France U-18. On 11 August 2016, Ierardi made his debut at U-19 level in a 1–0 home defeat against Croatia U-19, he was replaced by Niccolò Tofanari in the 70th minute.

Career statistics

Club

References

External links
 

1998 births
Sportspeople from the Metropolitan City of Milan
Living people
Italian footballers
Association football defenders
Italy youth international footballers
Genoa C.F.C. players
Ravenna F.C. players
F.C. Südtirol players
L.R. Vicenza players
Delfino Pescara 1936 players
Serie B players
Serie C players
Footballers from Lombardy